Nan-Wei Gong is a Taiwanese engineer, inventor, and entrepreneur whose work focuses on wearable technology.

Education 
Gong earned her bachelors and masters degrees in Materials Science and Engineering at National Tsing Hua University in Taiwan. After spending a summer internship working with Joseph Paradiso at Massachusetts Institute of Technology (MIT), Gong decided to attend the school where she earned her Masters in 2009 and her PhD in the Responsive Environments Group in the MIT Media Lab in 2013. In 2013 Gong was part of a team that won the Robert P. Goldberg $100,000 grand prize at Massachusetts Institute of Technology's $100K Entrepreneurship Competition. The team created "new sensor-level software that recognizes three-dimensional gestures on small, battery-powered, mobile devices." Gong worked in MIT's Media Lab as a research assistant for seven years.

Career 
Gong founded Circular2, a technology consulting company in 2014. Gong is a co-inventor of a device for "sensing floor for locating people and devices. A patent was issued to Microsoft for this invention in 2015. Gong co-founded FIGUR8, a company that develops wearable technology that can assess the musculoskeletal system in minutes. This technology allows for better accessibility and visibility of soft-tissue recovery and treatment planning compared to MRI's and X-Ray scans.

References 

21st-century Taiwanese engineers
Taiwanese women company founders
Taiwanese women engineers
National Tsing Hua University alumni
Year of birth missing (living people)
Living people
21st-century Taiwanese businesspeople
Massachusetts Institute of Technology alumni
21st-century businesswomen
Taiwanese company founders